Monique Régimbald-Zeiber (born April 24, 1947) is a Canadian painter.

Life and work

Monique Régimbald-Zeiber was born in Sorel, Quebec. From 1972 until 1973 she studied Russian literature at Moscow State University before returning to Canada to earn her master's degree in Russian and literature at McGill University in 1975, followed by a PhD in 1980. Two years later, she earned a Bachelor of Fine Arts in visual arts from Concordia University.

She lives and works in Montréal. In 1996, she co-founded a publishing house, Les Éditions les Petits Carnets, with Louise Déry. She was associate professor of painting at the University of Quebec at Montreal from 1992 to 2012. In 2010, she was included in a group exhibition titled "Expansion" and in 2012, "The Body in Question(s)", both at the University of Quebec. In 2017, she participated in the Musée d'art contemporain de Montréal's exhibition "That's how the light gets in" exhibition, which examined the use of light by artists.

Régimbald-Zeiber explores the "relationship between the image and the written word" in her work. She also examines women's history.

Notable collections
Les dessous de l’Histoire : Marguerite B., les écrits, 2002-2003, Musée national des beaux-arts du Québec

Awards
 (2022) Governor General's Award in Visual and Media Arts

References

External links
 
Les Éditions les Petits Carnets 

1947 births
Living people
People from Sorel-Tracy
Artists from Montreal
Canadian women painters
McGill University alumni
Concordia University alumni
Academic staff of the École des beaux-arts de Montréal
Governor General's Award in Visual and Media Arts winners